Laura Martínez may refer to:

 Laura Martínez (television presenter) (born 1964), Uruguayan television presenter, actress and dancer
 Laura Martínez Ruiz (born 1984), Spanish artistic gymnast
 Laura Martínez (judoka), Spanish judoka
 Laura Martínez de Carvajal, the first female doctor in Cuba